Rubielos is the name of several towns in Spain:

 Rubielos de Mora, a town in the province of Teruel, Aragon
 Rubielos de la Cérida, a town in the province of Teruel, Aragon

See also:

 Mora de Rubielos, a town in the province of Teruel, Aragon
 Fuentes de Rubielos, a town in the province of Teruel, Aragon